was a town located in Hiraka District, Akita Prefecture, Japan.

In 2003, the town had an estimated population of 10,829 and a density of 147.13 persons per km². The total area was 73.60 km².

On October 1, 2005, Omonogawa, along with the towns of Hiraka, Jūmonji, Masuda and Ōmori; and the villages of Sannai and Taiyū (all from Hiraka District), was merged into the expanded city of Yokote.

External links
 Yokote official website 

Dissolved municipalities of Akita Prefecture
Yokote, Akita